The Relief of Genoa took place between 28 March 1625 and 24 April 1625, during the Thirty Years' War. It was a major naval expedition launched by Spain against the French-occupied Republic of Genoa, of which the capital Genoa was being besieged by a joint Franco-Savoyard army composed of 30,000 men and 3,000 cavalry.

In 1625, when the Republic of Genoa, traditionally an ally of Spain, was occupied by French troops of the Duke of Savoy, the city underwent a hard siege. It was known in Genoese governmental circles that one of the reasons why the Dutch government had offered their help to the Franco-Savoyan army was so that they could "hit the bank of the King of Spain".

However, the Spanish fleet commanded by General Álvaro de Bazán, Marquis of Santa Cruz, came to the aid of Genoa and relieved the city. Returning its sovereignty to the Republic of Genoa and forcing the French to raise the siege, they consequently began a combined campaign against the Franco-Savoyan forces that had overrun the Genoese Republic one year before. The joint Franco-Piedmontese army was forced to leave Liguria and Spanish troops invaded Piedmont, thereby securing the Spanish Road. Richelieu's Invasion of Genoa and the Valtelline had resulted in his humiliation by the Spaniards.

Background
In northern Italy, Philip IV of Spain had followed his father's efforts to defend Catholics in the valleys of Valtellina against the Protestants in Graubünden. In 1622 Richelieu had arranged an anti-Spanish league with Venice and Savoy. With his ascendancy, the French policy changed.

The French claimed that due to the alliance between them and the Duke of Savoy, they had to help Savoy, which was attacking Genoa, by attacking Valtelline and diverting the resources of the Spanish, who were supporters of Genoa. In the autumn of 1624, using the pretext that papal forces had not been withdrawn from the Valtelline as agreed, French and Swiss troops invaded the Catholic valleys of the Grey Leagues and seized the forts, to protect them, Richelieu had established the Governors of the Duchy of Milan. Consequently, Spain formed an alliance with the Grand Duke of Tuscany, the Duke of Modena and Parma, and the republics of Genoa and Lucca, deciding to make a several action.

The irony of a Cardinal attacking the troops of a Pope was not lost on Rome, Spain, and ultra-Catholics in France. In 1625 the French marshals François de Bonne, Duke of Lesdiguières and Charles de Blanchefort, Marquis de Créquy, joined the Duke of Savoy, invaded the territories of the dominion of Genoa. An attack on Genoa would cut the southern end of the Spanish Road and knock out Spain's banker.

The time seemed opportune, with the apparent convergence of Protestant hostility to the Habsburgs, and explains French participation in the London talks with Mansfeld. Richelieu hoped Britain and the Dutch would send a fleet to assist his own squadron in cutting the seaway between Spain and Genoa, while Venice attacked Milan.

François Annibal d'Estrées, Duke of Estrées and 3,500 French troops crossed Protestant Swiss territory to join a similar number of Rhetians levied with French money. More subsidies and troops poured into Savoy, where the French formed a third of the 30,000-strong army that began operations against Genoa in February 1625. The attack caught the Genoese Republic unprepared. Most of the Republic was overrun, while 4,000 reinforcements from Spain were intercepted by French warships in March.

By this time Cardinal Richelieu remarked:

The Duke of Estrées quickly conquered the Valtellina, because the Papal garrisons offered no resistance except at Riva and Chiavenna. Richelieu's elaborate plan then began to unravel. The Valtellina operation placed France in direct opposition to an essentially Francophile papacy, incensing the dévots. Don Gómez Suárez de Figueroa, Duke of Feria sent 6,000 men and Tommaso Caracciolo, Count of Roccarainola as Maestro de Campo in order to reinforce the city of Genoa, which continued to resist the Franco-Savoyard siege. Venice abstained from the fighting, while British and Dutch support failed to materialize, enabling Spain to break through the relatively weak French fleet and relieve Genoa in August.

Genoese doge Alessandro Giustiniani, wrote:

France also sent financial help to the Dutch Republic, and subsidised the siege of Mansfeld.

French threat
The number of galleys of the Genoese republic were increased from eight to ten, and the republic was defended by around 11,000 soldiers consisting of German mercenaries and men raised within the walls of the republic. By February the invaders were within sight of the city and began to occupy the western riviera. In March Genoa was attacked by the combined army and the French fleet threatened to cut communications with Spain, capturing three Genoese ships carrying nearly 650,000 pieces of eight.

Yet while the strategic importance of the city and port of Genoa to the Spanish military system ensured that an attack would certainly succeed in drawing off Spanish troops, it presented France with military difficulties that were as considerable as those of the Valtelline theatre. Above all, Spanish naval superiority would make an effective seaward blockade of Genoa impossible, and greatly reduce the likelihood of success if the siege proved to be lengthy. Moreover, an attack on a third party, albeit a firm ally of Spain, was hard to reconcile with the rhetoric of liberating the peninsula from the yoke of Habsburg servitude; other secondary powers such as Mantua, Modena, Parma and especially France's habitual ally, Venice, drew the obvious conclusion and declined to join the Franco-Savoyard initiative.

Despite these dangers the Duke de Lesdigueres and constable of France, moved down through Piedmont to blockade Genoa with an army of 23,000 men, one third of whom were French.

At first, Richelieu sought to present the military situation to the king in the most optimistic light, maintaining in May 1625 that:

Yet even this mémoire could not avoid reference to the growing concern that Spain might widen the conflict by an attack from Flanders of up from Spain itself.

Genoa entrusted the command of his army to the Carlo Doria, Duke of Tursi and his general field master Giovanni Gerolamo Doria, while the Marquis of Santa Cruz was ordered to relieve the city. Spanish infantry from Naples embarked, carrying a total of 4,000 soldiers among whom 2,000 were elite infantry tercios viejos from the Army of Flanders. Santa Cruz reached Genoa and was received with great joy by the decayed spirits of the citizens. Soon the tenacity and experience of the Tercios under the Duke of Feria obtained good results and the French army began to retreat, as they were besieged by two fronts and the situation was becoming unsustainable. After a month the Franco-Savoian retreated and the Spanish was able to capture the city, so very important for their economy. Santa Cruz also counter-attacked by sea, destroying three French warships at the Hyeres islands.

Piedmontese theatre

Richelieu arrived at Turin on 1 February 1625, and at the walls of Asti on the 4 March, between Genoa and Milan. After storming Capriata, Novi and Rossiglione, Lesiguières decided to slow his pace, capturing Voltaggio and preferring to lay siege to Gavi, against the advice of the Duke of Savoy. Gavi surrendered on the 22 April, but it was too late to take Genoa. In the Tyrol, an imperial army was preparing to intervene in the Valtelline valley, while the Spanish army under the Duke of Feria prepared to come to Genoa's aid. The Spanish took Acqui then marched against Casale, reclaiming Gavi and Novi, while Lesdiguieres beat a retreat to the Piedmont. The Duke of Savoy, joined by the Marquis de Créquy, who replaced Lesdiguieres (who had returned to the Dauphine) beat a retreat to the Piedmont and entrenched their army at Verrua. The Duke of Feria was stopped on the 5 August 1625, and shortly afterwards he lifted the siege of Verrua and Lesdiguieres took his troops back to the Dauphiné. Feria managed to rescue the panicked Genoese governors that were hidden inside the walls of Savona. French-Savoyan policies were lying in ruins. At the end the force led by the Duke of Savoy and the Marquis of Créquy met not easy victory but fierce resistance from the militia of the Genoese Apennines, supported by Spanish forces from Milan. The Invaders were forced to retreat, and returned across the Alps in November.

Reconquest of the French Riviera

After the Spanish had relieved Genoa, the Genoese allowed their troops to be placed under the command of the Count of Roccarainola, as suggested by the Spanish crown. Galeazzo Giustiani with four of the republic's galleys captured the Savoyard capitana and things seemed to be taking a turn for the better. Disillusion with Spanish management of the war came quickly, though. The Genoese were eager to recover their lost territories, but Santa Cruz, now with seventy galleys in the port, refused to leave the city.

The reconquest was brought about that summer and the following autumn by a fleet of forty galleys under the joint command of the republic's general, Emmanuele Garbarino, Spanish admiral Santa Cruz, and the Duke of Tursi. By October the republic had recuperated all its lost territory with the exception of the castle of La Penna and had even added Oneglia, Ormea, and a number of localities in Piedmont to its possessions.

Santa Cruz successfully stormed and captured the forts of Albenga, Port Maurice, Ventimiglia, Lovan, Gandore, Casanova, Oneglia, Triola, Bigran, San Remo, Camporosso, conquering the biggest islets of the Lérins Islands, Île Sainte-Marguerite and Île Saint-Honorat. The Spanish retained both islands until they were reconquered by the French admiral Philippe de Poincy, on 12 March 1637.

Aftermath
The relief on Genoa lasted one month, but Spanish aid had been prompt and effective. The reversal of Genoese sorts when all seemed lost, the continued arrival of silver shipments even in Spanish galleys, and the unwavering behavior of Doria and his fellow asentistas de galeras all seemed to substantiate the positions of those who, like Doge Alessandro Giustiani in 1613, saw perfect union and harmony of intents in the alliance with Spain and the bonds between the Genoese nobility and Philip IV.

All was not to go to the republic's liking, however, in 1625. In October, at the height of success against Genoa's northern neighbor, the Spanish and the French, without consulting their respective allies signed a six-month truce, which was imposed on Genoa and Savoy as well.

In early 1626, as Savoy rearmed and the Republic of Genoa began to fear that it would again become the object of French and Piedmontese appetites, Santa Cruz proposed some modifications in the alliance between Spain and the republic. Given the events of the previous year, the Genoese were particularly well disposed toward Philip IV and accepted an alliance for the mutual defense of one another's states, the republic agreeing as well to maintain 14,000 infantry and 1,500 cavalry, the expenses for which they were to be reimbursed through the alienation to the Genoese of equivalent sums from the royal revenue in Spain. Furthermore, the republic agreed to send 70,000 scudi a month to the governor of Milan against similar assignations to be specified at a later date. In the event of a Savoyard attack on the republic, Philip IV committed himself to attacking Piedmont on its exposed side from Milan. And should Milan be attacked, the Genoese would invade Piedmont from the south.

In March 1626 the French and Spanish concluded the Treaty of Monzón, suspension of fighting between the Duke of Savoy and the Republic of Genoa being an integral part of the agreement. The Treaty on 5 March 1626, restored the pre-1618 situation with important qualifications. Jurisdiction was nominally restored over the Valtellina; this was now recognized as Catholic, which strengthened its autonomy and introduced doubt as to who could decide on transit through the valley. Papal troops replaced the French though the forts were supposed to be destroyed.

Monzón represented a serious reverse for Richelieu who blamed his envoy for the terms and feigned illness to avoid seeing the furious Savoyard ambassador. Abandoned, Savoy was obliged to make its own peace and now sought a Spanish alliance and intrigued with French malcontents against Richelieu, including possible involvement in the Chalais plot to murder the cardinal in 1626. The Valtelline valley was returned to the Vatican. Spanish forces scored a series of striking successes. In the spring of 1625 they regained Bahia in Brazil and Breda in the Netherlands from the Dutch. In the autumn they repulsed the English at Cadiz.

See also
Second Genoese–Savoyard War
Annus mirabilis

References

Sources

 Bercé, Yves Marie. The Birth of Absolutism: A History of France, 1598–1661. Palgrave USA (2003) 
 Braudel, Fernand. Civilization and Capitalism, 15th–18th Century: The Perspective of the World. University of California Press (1992) 
 Callo, Joseph F. Who's Who in Naval History: From 1550 to the Present.  Routledge. 
 Ciro, Paoletti. A Military History of Italy. Praeger Publishing (2007) 
 
 Engels, Marie-Christine. Merchants, Interlopers, Seamen and Corsairs: The "Flemish" Community in Livorno and Genoa (1615–1635). Verloren Publishing (1997) 
 Kirk, Allison Thomas. Genoa and the Sea: Policy and Power in an Early Modern Maritime Republic. The Johns Hopkins University Press (2005) 
 Moote Lloyd, A. Louis XIII, the Just. University of California Press (1991) 
 Osborne, Toby. Dynasty and Diplomacy in the Court of Savoy; Political Culture and the Thirty Years' War. Cambridge University Press; 1st edition (2007) 
 Parker, Geoffrey. The Thirty Years' War. Routledge; 2nd edition (1997) 
 Parker, Geoffrey. Europe in Crisis, 1598–1648. Wiley-Blackwell; 2nd edition (2001) 
 
 Pearce, Brian; Lublinskaya, A.D. French Absolutism: The Crucial Phase, 1620–1629. Cambridge University Press; 1st edition (October 30, 2008) 
 Stradling, Robert A. Spain's Struggle for Europe, 1598–1668. London: Hambledon & London Publishing (2003) 
 Thion, Stéphane. French Armies of the Thirty Years War. Auzielle: LRT Publishing (2008) 
 Thompson, William R. Great Power Rivalries. Columbia: University of South Carolina Press (1999)

External links
 First Genoese-Savoyard War, 1625

Battles of the Thirty Years' War
Conflicts in 1625
1625 in Europe
Naval battles of the Thirty Years' War
Naval battles involving Spain
Naval battles involving France
Naval battles involving the Republic of Genoa
Relief
1625 in the Republic of Genoa
Naval battles involving Savoy
Events in Genoa
Genoa